W.G. Grace was mainly associated with the new London County Cricket Club during this period. His first-class career ended in 1908 when he was nearly 60.

Background
Having ended his international career, Grace then began the last phase of his overall first-class career when he joined the new London County Cricket Club, based at Crystal Palace Park, which played first-class matches between 1900 and 1904.  Grace's presence initially attracted other leading players into the team, including Fry, Ranjitsinhji and Johnny Douglas, but the increased importance of the County Championship, combined with Grace's inevitable decline in form and the lack of a competitive element in London's matches, led to reduced attendances and consequently the club lost money.  Nevertheless, Grace remained an attraction and could still produce good performances.  As late as 1902, though aged 54 by the end of the season, he scored 1187 runs in first-class cricket, with two centuries, at an average of 37.09.  But London's final first-class matches were played in 1904 and the enterprise folded in 1908.

Grace made 19 first-class appearances in 1900, scoring 1,277 runs, with a highest score of 126, at an average of 42.56 with 3 centuries and 8 half-centuries. In the field, he took 6 catches and 32 wickets with a best analysis of 5–66. His bowling average was 30.28; he had 5 wickets in an innings 3 times.

Grace made 19 first-class appearances in 1901, scoring 1,007 runs, with a highest score of 132, at an average of 32.48 with 1 century and 7 half-centuries. In the field, he took 7 catches and 51 wickets with a best analysis of 7–30. His bowling average was 21.78; he had 5 wickets in an innings 5 times and 10 wickets in a match once.

Grace made 22 first-class appearances in 1902, scoring 1,187 runs, with a highest score of 131, at an average of 37.09 with 2 centuries and 7 half-centuries. In the field, he took 6 catches and 46 wickets with a best analysis of 5–29. His bowling average was 23.34; he had 5 wickets in an innings 4 times.

Grace made 16 first-class appearances in 1903, scoring 593 runs, with a highest score of 150, at an average of 22.80 with 1 centuries and 1 half-century. In the field, he took 5 catches and 10 wickets with a best analysis of 6–102. His bowling average was 47.90; he had 5 wickets in an innings once.

Grace made 15 first-class appearances in 1904, scoring 637 runs, with a highest score of 166, at an average of 25.48 with 1 century and 3 half-centuries. In the field, he took 2 catches and 21 wickets with a best analysis of 6–78. His bowling average was 32.71; he had 5 wickets in an innings once.

With the demise of London County, the number of Grace's appearances dwindled over the next four seasons until he made his final appearance in first-class cricket in 1908.  He made 9 first-class appearances in 1905, scoring 250 runs, with a highest score of 71, at an average of 19.23 with just the one half-century. In the field, he took 2 catches and 7 wickets with a best analysis of 4–121. His bowling average was 54.71.

Grace's final appearance for the Gentlemen versus the Players was in July 1906 at The Oval.  He made only five first-class appearances that season, scoring 241 runs, with a highest score of 74, at an average of 26.77 with 2 half-centuries. In the field, he took 4 catches and 13 wickets with a best analysis of 4–71. His bowling average was 20.61.

He made only one appearance in 1907, scoring 16 and 3 in his two innings.  He took no catches and did not bowl.

Grace made his final first-class appearance on 20–22 April 1908 for the Gentlemen of England v Surrey at The Oval, where, opening the innings, he scored 15 and 25.  This was his sole appearance in 1908.

Footnote

• a) As described in Grace's first-class career statistics, there are different versions of Grace's first-class career totals as a result of disagreement among cricket statisticians re the status of some matches he played in.  Note that this is a statistical issue only and has little, if any, bearing on the historical aspects of Grace's career. In the infobox, the "traditional" first-class figures from Wisden 1916 (as reproduced by Rae, pp. 495–496), are given first and the "amended" figures from CricketArchive follow in parentheses. There is no dispute about Grace's Test career record and those statistics are universally recognised. See Variations in first-class cricket statistics for more information.

References

External links
 CricketArchive – WG Grace

Bibliography

 
 
 
 
 
 
 
 
 

English cricket seasons in the 19th century
English cricket seasons in the 20th century
1900